12 teams took part in the league with CSKA Moscow winning the championship.

League standings

Results

Top scorers
18 goals
 Aleksandr Ponomarev (Torpedo Moscow)

17 goals
 Vasili Kartsev (Dynamo Moscow)
 Sergei Solovyov (Dynamo Moscow)

16 goals
 Valentin Nikolayev (CDKA Moscow)

15 goals
 Boris Paichadze (Dinamo Tbilisi)

12 goals
 Grigory Fedotov (CDKA Moscow)

10 goals
 Yevgeni Arkhangelsky (Dynamo Leningrad)
 Viktor Panyukov (Dinamo Tbilisi)

9 goals
 Vasili Lotkov (Dynamo Leningrad)
 Sergei Salnikov (Spartak Moscow)
 Vasili Trofimov (Dynamo Moscow)

References

 Soviet Union - List of final tables (RSSSF)

1946
1
Soviet
Soviet